Chaitra also known as Chait is the last (12th) month in the Bikram Sambat, the official Nepali calendar. This month coincides with March 15 to April 13 of the Western calendar and is 30 days long.

Important Events during this month:
March 26: Chait 12, Chaite Dashain
March 27: Chait 13, Ram Nawami

Months in Nepali calendar

Nepali calendar